1939 Battle of Westerplatte, originally titled in Poland as Tajemnica Westerplatte ("The Secret of Westerplatte"), is a 2013 Polish-Lithuanian war film written and directed by Paweł Chochlew. It portrays the Battle of Westerplatte between the Polish Army and Nazi German forces at the start of World War II in 1939. The film focuses on the conflict between Westerplatte commander Henryk Sucharski (Michał Żebrowski) and his deputy Franciszek Dąbrowski (Robert Żołędziewski).

Cast
 Michał Żebrowski − as Major Henryk Sucharski
 Robert Żołędziewski − as Capt. Franciszek Dąbrowski
 Borys Szyc − as Lieut. Stefan Grodecki
 Piotr Adamczyk − as Capt. Mieczysław Słaby
 Jan Englert − as Wincenty Sobociński
 Jakub Wesołowski − as Bernard Rygielski
 Andrzej Grabowski − as Adolf Petzelt
 Przemysław Cypryański − as Lieut. Zdzisław Kręgielski
 Mirosław Baka − as Cpl. Eugeniusz Grabowski
 Mirosław Zbrojewicz − as Jan Gryczman

Reception
The film has sparked some controversy with allegations saying it was "anti-Polish" and "unpatriotic" in its revisionist attitude to the heroic myth of the Battle of Westerplatte which became a symbol of the against-the-odds defiance to the Nazi invasion, and a group of historians even dismissed it as a false depiction of the battle that is being "offensive to the dignity and honour of Polish soldiers." According to The Telegraph, "while the film has garnered its detractors, cinema critics have dismissed claims that The Secret of Westerplatte belittles the soldiers who fought and died in the battle. One critic described it as a "hymn to the heroism of the defenders of Westerplatte.'"

Possibly in an attempt to deflect the negative criticism, which the title word "Tajemnica" (Secret), implying as it does that the film makes revelations and runs against the long-held perception of the battle as an heroic Polish defence, publicity posters omitting the word were produced and at least three other versions of the title have been used. These range from the non-committal "1939 Westerplatzer Battlefield" and "1939 Battle of Westerplatte" to another version that unambiguously addresses the issue, "Heroes of Westerplatte 1939".

References

2013 war drama films
2013 films
Films set in Gdańsk
Films set in the 1930s
Lithuanian drama films
Polish historical films
Polish war drama films
2010s Polish-language films
World War II films based on actual events
Siege films
Films scored by Jan A. P. Kaczmarek
2013 drama films
Polish World War II films